Lexington Assessment and Reception Center (LARC) is a maximum-security state prison for men located in Lexington, Cleveland County, Oklahoma, owned and operated by the Oklahoma Department of Corrections. The LARC complex also hosts the medium-security Lexington Correctional Center and the Rex Thompson Minimum Security Unit.

It was first opened in 1978 and has a capacity of 1450 inmates.  In May 2015, state officials said LARC was operating at 112% of capacity, and that overcrowding and understaffing had created security issues.

Five days out of the week, minimum security offenders work within the Prisoner Public Work Program or the City of Lexington, City of Noble, Oklahoma Department of Mental Health and Substance Abuse Services, Oklahoma Correctional Industries, and the Oklahoma Military Department. 

Medium security offenders can attend the Lexington Career Tech Skills Center on the grounds of the facility. Second Chance Sanctuary, an animal rescue, in conjunction with Friends of Folks, operate a program for long-term offenders to train dogs to be donated to nursing homes or for use as companion dogs.

References

Prisons in Oklahoma
Buildings and structures in Cleveland County, Oklahoma
1978 establishments in Oklahoma